Bërdicë is a former municipality in the Shkodër County, northwestern Albania. At the 2015 local government reform it became a subdivision of the municipality Shkodër. The population at the 2011 census was 5,773.

Settlements 
There are 7 settlements within Bërdicë.

 Beltojë
 Bërdicë e Madhe
 Bërdicë e Mesme
 Bërdicë e Sipërme
 Mali Hebaj
 Mllojë
 Trush

References 

 
Former municipalities in Shkodër County
Administrative units of Shkodër